Carlos César dos Santos (born 12 March 1980), known as Césinha, is a Brazilian former footballer who played as a left winger.

Club career
Born in São Paulo, Césinha represented Esporte Clube Juventude in his country's Série A. He moved abroad in 2004, joining S.C. Braga in Portugal and making his Primeira Liga debut on 30 August by coming on as a second-half substitute in a 2–2 away draw against Académica de Coimbra; in his first season he scored in both league matches with S.C. Beira-Mar, helping to a 4–1 away win and a 1–1 home draw respectively.

In the summer of 2007, Césinha was sold to Romanian side FC Rapid București for €600,000. He netted five goals in his debut campaign, helping his team rank third in Liga I.

Released by Rapid in 2011 at the age of 31, Césinha went on to represent several clubs in quick succession before returning to his country after signing with lowly Brasiliense Futebol Clube.

Honours
Rapid București 
Supercupa României: 2007

References

External links

1980 births
Living people
Footballers from São Paulo
Brazilian footballers
Association football wingers
Campeonato Brasileiro Série A players
Campeonato Brasileiro Série B players
Club Athletico Paranaense players
Londrina Esporte Clube players
Santa Cruz Futebol Clube players
Sociedade Esportiva e Recreativa Caxias do Sul players
Brasiliense Futebol Clube players
Primeira Liga players
Liga Portugal 2 players
Segunda Divisão players
S.C. Braga players
Moreirense F.C. players
Amarante F.C. players
F.C. Tirsense players
Rebordosa A.C. players
Liga I players
FC Rapid București players
FC Petrolul Ploiești players
Football League (Greece) players
Athlitiki Enosi Larissa F.C. players
Cypriot First Division players
Ermis Aradippou FC players
Brazilian expatriate footballers
Expatriate footballers in Portugal
Expatriate footballers in Romania
Expatriate footballers in Greece
Expatriate footballers in Cyprus
Brazilian expatriate sportspeople in Portugal
Brazilian expatriate sportspeople in Romania
Brazilian expatriate sportspeople in Greece
Brazilian expatriate sportspeople in Cyprus